Madeleine Minou Martin (born 20 August 1991, in Gothenburg) is a Swedish actress.

Biography 
In fall 2009, Martin starred as Cleo in Sveriges Television's Web series Riverside. Since then, she has starred in the short film The Art of Breaking Up, and in the film Studio Sex, which is one of the many films about the character Annika Bengtzon, in which she portrayed the bartender Patricia. Martin has a role in the film Easy Money II: Hard to Kill (2012), in which she portrayed the character Nadja. She reprised the role in the sequel Easy Money III: Life Deluxe (2013). In 2014, she portrayed the character Fatima in Sveriges Television's Christmas calendar Piratskattens hemlighet.

Madeleine Martin is sister to actor and director Philip Martin.

Filmography

References

External links 
 

1991 births
Swedish film actresses
Swedish television actresses
Living people
People from Kungsbacka
21st-century Swedish actresses